High Noon is a 2000 American Western television film directed by Rod Hardy and written by Carl Foreman and T. S. Cook. It is a remake of the 1952 film High Noon. The film stars Tom Skerritt, Susanna Thompson, Reed Diamond, María Conchita Alonso, Dennis Weaver, August Schellenberg and Michael Madsen. The film premiered on TBS on August 20, 2000.

Plot
Variety noted that the plot had only minor changes from the original film. 

In the late 1890s, Will Kane is the chief marshal of Hadleyville, a small town in the New Mexico Territory; even though all of his deputies have resigned, Kane continues to serve due his strong sense of duty. His new wife, Amy, is a Quaker and pacifist who deplores violence. At her urging, Kane decides to retire and become a farmer. 

However, Kane then learns that Frank Miller, a gunfighter and killer he brought to justice years ago, has been pardoned and will arrive in Hadleyville on the noon train. Miller's old gang has returned to join him, and a message arrives stating that his first order of business will be to shoot Kane dead as revenge for convicting him.

Kane reaches out to his former deputies for help, but all of them refuse for various reasons. He then tries forming a posse, but the townspeople are even less willing to fight alongside him. Some are sympathetic to Miller as his notoriety made the town famous and they blame Kane for ruining a good thing, while others are afraid of him or feel that it isn't their responsibility to uphold the law. Several residents do volunteer anyway, but Kane is forced to turn them away as they are either too young, old, or physically unfit to fight.

A desperate Kane turns to his friend Judge Mettrick for advice; Mettrick simply tells him to leave town as he originally planned to. Unwilling to abandon his post, Kane decides to face Miller and his gang alone. Amy, who had threatened to leave on the noon train with or without Kane, returns and saves him by shooting one of Miller's men in the back. Kane finally guns his nemesis down after he tries to threaten Amy. After Miller's death, the town people come out to congratulate and thank Kane. Without saying a word, he throws his marshal's badge in the dirt and rides away.

Cast 
Tom Skerritt as Will Kane
Susanna Thompson as Amy Kane
Reed Diamond as Harvey Pell
María Conchita Alonso as Helen Ramirez
Dennis Weaver as Mart Howe
August Schellenberg as Antonio
Michael Madsen as Frank Miller
Matthew Walker as Judge Mettrick
Frank C. Turner as Station Master
Shaun Johnston as Joe Henderson
Terry King as Henry Munchhausen 
Kate Newby as Janet Munchhausen
David LeReaney as Sam Beattie
Noel Fisher as Billy
Joe Norman Shaw as Dave Cleaver
Trevor Leigh as Pete Cleaver
Colin A. Campbell as Jordan 
Jim Leyden as Simpson
Stephen Eric McIntyre as Pierce
Jim Shield as Colby
Royal Sproule as Liam
Tom McBeath as Rudy
Jacqueline Robbins as Jane
Joyce Robbins as Hannah
Judith Buchan as Glenda Beattie

Production
Filming took place in Calgary, and lasted for 19 days.

References

External links
 

2000 television films
2000 films
2000 Western (genre) films
2000s American films
2000s English-language films
American Western (genre) television films
Films based on adaptations
Films based on American short stories
Films directed by Rod Hardy
Films shot in Calgary
Films with screenplays by Carl Foreman
Remakes of American films
TBS original films
Television films based on short fiction
Television remakes of films
Western (genre) film remakes